Lionel Abate Etoundi (born 25 September 2000) is a Cameroonian professional footballer who plays as a forward for Polish club Wisła Sandomierz, on loan from Podbeskidzie Bielsko-Biała.

Club career
He started his career at local Cameroonian side AS Fortuna, from where he made a loan move to the United States joining Real Monarchs. Etoundi made 9 appearances and scored once for the team in the 2019 USL Championship season. He was part of the championship winning team.

On 18 January 2022, he joined Polish fifth division club Kuźnia Ustroń. In July 2022, Etoundi moved to I liga side Podbeskidzie Bielsko-Biała, initially to play for their reserve team. On 30 August 2022, he was registered to play in I liga and made his debut for the senior team, scoring once in a 2–1 Polish Cup away loss against Lechia Zielona Góra.

On 17 February 2023, he was loaned to fourth division club Wisła Sandomierz until the end of the season.

International career
Etoundi had been regular in Cameroonian youth squads since 2015, having started then with the U17 level, followed by U20, before joining the U23 squad where it has made greatest impact, especially during 2018.

Honours
Real Monarchs
USL Championship: 2019

References

2000 births
Living people
Sportspeople from Yaoundé
Cameroonian footballers
Association football forwards
Real Monarchs players
OFK Žarkovo players
Coton Sport FC de Garoua players
Podbeskidzie Bielsko-Biała players
USL Championship players
I liga players
IV liga players
Cameroonian expatriate footballers
Cameroonian expatriate sportspeople in the United States
Cameroonian expatriate sportspeople in Serbia
Cameroonian expatriate sportspeople in Poland
Expatriate soccer players in the United States
Expatriate footballers in Serbia
Expatriate footballers in Poland